Félix Coquereau (28 November 1808, Laval - 9 November 1866, Paris) was chief almoner to the French Navy. He accompanied the final return of Napoleon's remains to France in 1840.

1808 births
1866 deaths
Grand Officiers of the Légion d'honneur
French abbots
People of the July Monarchy
French Navy
Burials at Père Lachaise Cemetery